The 2003 Mexican Figure Skating Championships took place in Lomas Verdes. Skaters competed in the disciplines of men's singles and ladies' singles on the senior level. The results were used to choose the Mexican teams to the 2003 World Championships and the 2003 Four Continents Championships.

Senior results

Men

Ladies

External links
 results

Mexican Figure Skating Championships, 2003
Mex
Figure Skating Championships, 2003
Fig
Mexican Figure Skating Championships